Paul M. Montrone (born March 8, 1941) is the Chairman, President, and CEO of Perspecta Trust LLC, Liberty Lane Partners and Latona Associates.  Montrone was the Chairman and CEO of Fisher Scientific until its 2006 merger with Thermo Electron.

Early life and career
Montrone was born in Scranton, Pennsylvania, in 1941. He obtained a Bachelor of Science magna cum laude from the University of Scranton in 1962 and a PhD from Columbia Business School in 1962.

Montrone began his career at the Pentagon, serving in the Systems Analysis Group in the Office of the United States Secretary of Defense Robert McNamara while a Captain in the U.S. Army. He later served as CEO of Wheelabrator Technologies. Montrone eventually became President and CEO of Fisher Scientific in 1991 and Chairman in 1998, resigning upon the company's merger with Thermo Electron in 2006.

Montrone had been Executive Vice President of the Signal Companies, Inc. and its successor, AlliedSignal Inc. now Honeywell, President of the Henley Group, Inc. and Executive Vice President and CFO of Wheelabrator-Frye Inc.

During the Clinton Administration, he was a member of the President’s Advisory Commission on Consumer Protection and Quality in the Health Care Industry, and a founder of the National Forum for Health Care Quality Measurement and Reporting.  He was a Director of the Healthcare Leadership Council and the New England Healthcare Institute, and a member of the Health and Retirement Task Force of the Business Roundtable. He is a Director and Treasurer of the Foundation for the National Institutes of Health.

He has also been involved in Washington, D.C., business policy matters, mainly through his activity with the Business Roundtable, where he was a member of its planning committee, and Chairman of the Civil Justice Reform Taskforce.

Montrone has served as President and CEO of The Metropolitan Opera, where he is now President Emeritus.  His current other non-profit boards include the New England Conservatory, the Boston Symphony Orchestra, and the Columbia University Graduate School of Business.

References

Further reading

Columbia Business School alumni
Living people
University of Scranton alumni
1941 births